Bob Cratchit is a fictional character in the Charles Dickens 1843 novel A Christmas Carol. The abused, underpaid clerk of Ebenezer Scrooge (and possibly Jacob Marley, when he was alive), Cratchit has come to symbolize the poor working conditions, especially long working hours and low pay, endured by many working-class people in the early Victorian era.

In the novel
When Cratchit timidly asks Scrooge for Christmas Day off work so he can be with his family, Scrooge at first threatens to dock his pay, but reluctantly agrees on the condition that Cratchit comes to work early the day after Christmas.

Cratchit and his family live in poverty because Scrooge is too miserly to pay him a decent wage. Cratchit's son, Tiny Tim, is crippled and sick; according to the Ghost of Christmas Present, Tim will die because the family is too poor to give him the treatment he needs. While Cratchit's family curses Scrooge for his stinginess, however, Cratchit says he feels sorry for his employer, and insists that they toast his health.

After Scrooge decides to change his ways on Christmas Day, he anonymously sends a Christmas turkey to Cratchit for his family's dinner. The next day Scrooge states that he will increase Cratchit's salary immediately and promises to help his struggling family.

Family
The Cratchit family has been described as "impoverished, hardworking, and warmhearted".

Seven members are mentioned in the original story, five of whom are named:
 Mrs. Cratchit, Bob Cratchit's wife, who is named Emily in some adaptations.
 Martha Cratchit, the eldest daughter, who works as an apprentice at a milliners.
 Belinda Cratchit, the second daughter.
 Peter Cratchit, the heir, for whom his father is arranging employment at the weekly rate of five shillings and sixpence.
 Timothy "Tiny Tim" Cratchit. The youngest child, he is desperately ill and walks with a crutch.

Notable portrayals
 Edward Richard Wright in A Christmas Carol; or, Past, Present, and Future (1844)
 J. L. Toole in A Christmas Carol; or, Past, Present, and Future (1859)
 Charles S. Ogle in the 1910 film A Christmas Carol
 Donald Calthrop in the 1935 film Scrooge. Calthrop bore a remarkable resemblance to Cratchit as illustrated in the original published edition of A Christmas Carol.
 Gene Lockhart in the 1938 film A Christmas Carol
 Patrick Whyte in the 1949 television film The Christmas Carol
 Mervyn Johns in the 1951 film Scrooge
 Bob Sweeney in the 1954 television film A Christmas Carol
 Martyn Green in the 1956 television film The Stingiest Man in Town
 Daws Butler in the 1958 parody record "Green Chri$tma$"
 Jack Cassidy in the 1962 animated television movie Mr. Magoo's Christmas Carol
 David Collings in the 1970 film Scrooge
 Melvyn Hayes in the 1971 animated short film A Christmas Carol
 Clive Merrison in the 1977 television movie A Christmas Carol
 Sonny Melendrez in the 1978 animated television movie The Stingiest Man in Town
 Rich Little impersonating Paul Lynde as Cratchit in the 1978 television movie Rich Little's Christmas Carol
 Mel Blanc (as Porky Pig) in the 1979 animated short film Bugs Bunny's Christmas Carol
 R.H. Thomson (as Thatcher) in the 1979 television film An American Christmas Carol
 Wayne Allwine (as Mickey Mouse) in the 1983 animated film Mickey's Christmas Carol
 David Warner in the 1984 television movie A Christmas Carol
 Alfre Woodard (as Grace Cooley) in the 1988 film Scrooged
 Steve Whitmire (as Kermit the Frog) in the 1992 film The Muppet Christmas Carol 
 Frank Welker (as Barney Rubble) in A Flintstones Christmas Carol, 1994
 Wendy Crewson (as Roberta Cratchit) in the 1995 television film Ebbie
 Michael York in the 1997 animated film A Christmas Carol
 Albert Schultz in the 1998 television movie Ebenezer
 Richard E. Grant in the 1999 television movie A Christmas Carol
 Brian McNamara in the 2000 television movie A Diva's Christmas Carol. Here Bob's character is merged with Scrooge's fiancée Belle.
 Rhys Ifans in the 2001 animated version  Christmas Carol: The Movie
 Phil Vischer (as Bob the Tomato) in An Easter Carol, 2004
 Bob Bergen (as Porky Pig in a similar but not identical role) in the 2006 video Bah, Humduck! A Looney Tunes Christmas
 Gary Oldman in the 2009 animated version  A Christmas Carol
Ashleigh Ball (as Rainbow Dash) in the 2016 series of My Little Pony: Friendship Is Magic episode A Hearth's Warming Tail.
 Jonathan Sayer (as Dennis Tyde) in Mischief Theatre's A Christmas Carol Goes Wrong.
 Kandyse McClure as Catherine Beadnell in Barbie in a Christmas Carol
 Joe Alwyn in the 2019 miniseries A Christmas Carol
 In Nature Cat's Christmas special A Nature Carol, a mouse named Bob Scratchit is Cratchit's mouse counterpart.
 Joey Richter in Starkid Productions' A VHS Christmas Carol.
 Johnny Flynn (voice) in Scrooge: A Christmas Carol.

In popular culture 
The character of Bob Cratchit has been featured in works based on A Christmas Carol.

 Writer/director Alexander Knott has written the play Cratchit, which "explores what might happen if Cratchit was visited by the Ghost of Christmas yet-to-come and shown a bleak vision of the future, where the gap between rich and poor has grown beyond measure."
 The character has been featured in the musical comedy Mrs. Bob Cratchit's Wild Christmas Binge.

Early Victorian Money 

The British Pound was fixed at $4.85 USD until 1915.  Since 1971 the Pound is floating and in Dec 2022 $1.22.   Web site "https://www.in2013dollars.com/" denotes UK inflation is 150 from 1843 to 2022.   Unknown if this calculator takes into account the exchange rate affecting purchasing power.

Pay: It is remarked by Scrooge that he pays 1/2 crown (2.5 shillings, 30 Pence) a day, 6 days a week.  That translated to 39 pounds a year.    Most clerks make a bit less (2 Bob a day) so Scrooge is paying his as a senior Clerk).
 Buying power:  1843 coins and their value is HOTLY debated.  A gold Pound (Sovereign) today from 1843 has melt value of $425 in gold and cost about $600 to purchase and a US $5 gold coin slightly higher value ($4.85 USD buys a gold pound).   Roughly, 600 times the prices of 1843 to equal current values.
 If a gold pound is today $600... then a penny is $2.50 USD and a shilling is $30.  A 1843 Shilling (12 pence) is about $30 in buying power and 240 Pence = 1 pound.     Roughly translates to $23,400 today (2022) and poverty pay and barely middle class.
 Dickens quotes often prices and pay of characters in his stories and about 100 pounds a year is required for a moderate middle class life with servants.  500+ for comfortable living as a gentleman.   
 Generally, people's salaries in Victorian England were very low compared to current income.

References

Literary characters introduced in 1843
A Christmas Carol characters
Fictional people from London
Fictional clerks
Fictional people from the 19th-century
Male characters in film
Male characters in literature